The Wakamarina River is a river of the Marlborough Region of New Zealand's South Island. In 1864, gold was found in the river near Havelock, and soon 6,000 men were working in the area. The gold rush did not last long and most miners moved on to the West Coast Gold Rush.

See also
List of rivers of New Zealand

References

Rivers of the Marlborough Region
Rivers of New Zealand